The Barisal Bulls are a franchise cricket team based in Barisal, Bangladesh, which plays in the Bangladesh Premier League (BPL). They are one of the seven teams that are competing in the 2016 Bangladesh Premier League. The team is being captained by Mushfiqur Rahim.

Player draft
The 2016 BPL draft was held on 30 September. Prior to the draft, the seven clubs signed 38 foreign players to contracts and each existing franchise was able to retain two home-grown players from the 2015 season. A total 301 players participated in the draft, including 133 local and 168 foreign players. 85 players were selected in the draft.

Standings

 The top four teams will qualify for playoffs
  advanced to the Qualifier
  advanced to the Eliminator

Player Transfers
Prior to the 2016 draft, a number of high-profile players moved teams. These included transfers between competing teams and due to the suspension of the Transfers included the move of Barisal Bulls captain Mahmudullah Riyad to the Khulna Titans, Chris Gayle from the Barisal Bulls to the Chittagong Vikings,

Current squad

Coach – Dav Whatmore
Assistant Coach – Akhinur Zaman
Assistant Coach – Shyamol Sarker
Physio – Joy Biswas
Trainer – Ahmed Islam
Video Analyst – Saurabh Walkar
Adviser & Chief Selector – Faruk Ahmed
Associate Selector – Athar Ali Khan
Owner – M.A. Awwal Chowdhury

References

Bangladesh Premier League